Maikammer is a municipality in the Südliche Weinstraße district, in Rhineland-Palatinate, Germany. It is situated on the German Wine Route, approx. 5 km south of Neustadt an der Weinstraße. Maikammer is the seat of the Verbandsgemeinde Maikammer.

Geography

Location 
Maikammer lies at elevations from 120 to 300 m at the foot of the Kalmit, the highest mountain in the Palatine Forest (673 m), in a landscape dominated by vineyards. Other high ground within the boundaries of the parish includes the north flank of the Schafkopf (617 m), the Rotsohlberg (607 m), the north flank of the Stotz (603 m), the northeast flank of the Breitenberg (545 m), the Flachkopf (498 m) and the Wetterkreuzberg (401 m).

Neighbouring municipalities are (clockwise): Neustadt an der Weinstraße, Kirrweiler (Pfalz), Edenkoben, Sankt Martin (Pfalz), Edenkoben (exclave), Gommersheim (exclave) and Kirrweiler (exclave).

Climate 
Due to its mild climate, not only do grapes grow here but also exotic fruit such as kiwis, lemons, almonds and sweet chestnuts.

Industry

Maikammer's local economy is predominantly supported by the wine industry.  The area is well known for the vineyards of Alsterweiler, Kappellenberg, Kirchenstück, Immengarten and Heiligenberg, which produce  Müller-Thurgau and Riesling grapes.  Wine has played a significant part in Maikammer's history, both economically and culturally.  Maikammer is also host to numerous villas built by the original wine families of the area, which now help to attract tourists to the area.

During the 1850s, Anton Ullrich and his brother Franz Ullrich established an enameling factory in Maikammer producing enameled kitchenware.  This factory was a major source of employment for the people of Maikammer, employing around 1,000 people at its peak.  The products made in Maikammer were sold throughout Europe, distribution  extended as far east as Russia.  The factory was closed in 1928 as a result of Germany's hyperinflation.

Spelling variations

The town of Maikammer has also been spelled in the following ways: Meinkeimere (1315), Meinkemer (1329), Menkemer (1335), Menkemere (1345), Meinkemeren (1346), Meinkemer (1348), Meinkeymer (1350, 1366), Meinkeimer (1370), Meinkemer (1391, 1419), Meynkeimere (1437), Meynkamere (1464), Meinkheimer (1468), Meyekeymere (1500), Mainkeimer (1542), Meynkammer (1560), Maycammer (1650), and since 1800 Maikammer.

Mayors
 Sebastian Frantz (1860–1904)
 Eduard Wolf (1904–1920)
 Dr. J.C. Wolf (1920–1933)
 Gustav Buchenberger (1933–1942)
 Otto Wingerter (1942–1945)
 Dr. J.C. Wolf (1945–1946)
 Alfred Wagner (1946–1947)
 Rudolf Straub (1947–1948)
 Hermann Ullrich (1948–1955, CDU)
 Johannes Damm (1955–1973, CDU)
 Rudolf Müller (1973–1974, CDU)
 Dieter Ziegler (1974–1994, CDU)
 Karl Schäfer (1994–incumbent, CDU)

Notable residents
 General Jakob Freiherr von Hartmann (1797–1873)
 Franz Ullrich (1830–1891), industrialist

References

 
Südliche Weinstraße